The Cape Town International Convention Centre (CTICC) is a convention centre in Cape Town, South Africa.  The centre opened in June 2003.  It is run as a partnership between the City of Cape Town and the Western Cape government.

Venues 
The CTICC is served by the Westin Grand Hotel located on the same premises in the north-western corner, and is situated close to the city centre.

The convention centre has exhibition and trade show space of approximately  that can be divided into multiple conference or banquet venues; a Grand Ballroom, which can be divided by soundproof partitioning. Catering is offered at the premises. The centre has two auditoriums, one seating up to 1500 and the other up to 620.

History 
It hosted the Final Draw of the 2010 FIFA World Cup South Africa on 4 December 2009. Guests in attendance included Nobel peace prize winners, former State President FW De Klerk and Desmond Tutu. The event was opened by President of South Africa, Jacob Zuma and President of FIFA, Sepp Blatter.

In 2013, the centre hosted 537 events, an increase from 514 in 2012. In 2014, it was estimated that the CTICC has contributed over R22 billion to the country's GDP and over R7 billion to the Western Cape's economy in the past eleven years. The centre will host the 2023 Netball World Cup.

Expansion process
Due to the success of the CTICC it was expanded in 2010.  A second round of expansion work is due to begin in February 2015 and is expected to be completed during 2017. The expansion is planned to add 10 000m² of floor space to the centre.

Controversies 
In August 2014, it was reported that the African National Congress had amassed a R1.3 million account with the CTICC since 2011. Executive director of auxiliary affairs, Gerard Ras, said that the ANC should not be allowed to use the facilities until the account is settled.

See also

List of convention and exhibition centers

References

External links
 Cape Town International Convention Centre
 Exhibition Association of Southern Africa

Commercial buildings completed in 2003
Buildings and structures in Cape Town
Convention centres in South Africa
Tourist attractions in Cape Town
Economy of Cape Town
Netball venues in South Africa
21st-century architecture in South Africa